Iakovos "Jake" Tsakalidis (born 10 June 1979) is a Georgian-born Greek former professional basketball player.

Tsakalidis, a  center, holds dual citizenship in Georgia, where he was born (he was born in what was at the time, the Soviet Union's Georgian Soviet Socialist Republic), and in Greece, where he was raised.

Professional career

Greece
Tsakalidis began his professional career in 1996, at the age of 17, with the Greek League club AEK Athens. With AEK, he was a 2-time Greek Cup finalist (1998, 1999), a FIBA Saporta Cup winner (2000), and a Greek Cup winner (2000). In those years with AEK, Tsakalidis played at a great level, especially in the painted zone area, where he complemented his teammates, Michalis Kakiouzis and Dimos Dikoudis, in that area.

In 2000, Tsakalidis left Greece, and moved to the United States. He began his NBA career that year, when he signed with the Phoenix Suns. He would spend the next 7 seasons playing with various NBA teams. In 2007, he returned to Greece, after leaving the Houston Rockets. He joined the Greek EuroLeague club Olympiacos.

NBA
Tsakalidis was selected by the Phoenix Suns, in the 1st round (25th overall) of the 2000 NBA draft. On 30 September 2003 Tsakalidis was traded by the Suns, along with teammate Bo Outlaw, to the Memphis Grizzlies, in exchange for Brevin Knight, Robert Archibald, and Cezary Trybański.

He was eventually traded by the Grizzlies to the Houston Rockets, on 13 February 2007, for small forward Scott Padgett. Tsakalidis' final NBA game was played on 28 April  2007 in Game 4 of the Western Conference First Round against the Utah Jazz. This series went to 7 games but Tsakaldis only played in Game 4 where Houston lost 85 - 98 and he recorded 2 points and 4 rebounds.

In his NBA career, he averaged 4.8 points per game and 3.9 rebounds per game.

National team career 
Tsakalidis played with the senior men's Greek national basketball team at the 1998 FIBA World Championship, where his team finished in 4th place, at the EuroBasket 1999, where his team finished in 16th place, and at the EuroBasket 2003, where his team finished in 5th place.

Personal life 
In 2000, Tsakalidis announced that his real name is Alexey Lentkov and he is not of Caucasus Greek descent as previously believed. Moreover, after research by a Greek journalist, it was found that Lentkov was actually born in Novosibirsk and changed his name in Rustavi sometime in the 1990s.

Career statistics

NBA

Regular season

|-
| align="left" | 2000–01
| align="left" | Phoenix
| 57 || 39 || 16.6 || .470 || .000 || .593 || 4.2 || .3 || .2 || 1.0 || 4.5
|-
| align="left" | 2001–02
| align="left" | Phoenix
| 67 || 47 || 23.6 || .475 || .000|| .698 || 5.6 || .3 || .3 || 1.0 || 7.3
|-
| align="left" | 2002–03
| align="left" | Phoenix
| 33 || 27 || 16.5 || .452 || .000 || .672 || 3.7 || .4 || .2 || .5 || 4.9
|-
| align="left" | 2003–04
| align="left" | Memphis
| 40 || 28 || 13.3 || .504 || .000 || .590 || 3.2 || .5 || .2 || .6 || 4.3
|-
| align="left" | 2004–05
| align="left" | Memphis
| 31 || 1 || 9.0 || .500 || .000 || .778 || 1.8 || .3 || .1 || .5 || 2.5
|-
| align="left" | 2005–06
| align="left" | Memphis
| 51 || 19 || 14.4 || .606 || .000 || .655 || 4.2 || .3 || .3 || .6 || 5.0
|-
| align="left" | 2006–07
| align="left" | Memphis
| 23 || 7 || 11.2 || .400 || .000 || .583 || 2.8 || .1 || .3 || .5 || 2.3
|-
| align="left" | 2006–07
| align="left" | Houston
| 13 || 0 || 10.2 || .409 || .000 || .800 || 3.1 || .1 || .3 || .5 || 2.3
|- class="sortbottom"
| style="text-align:center;" colspan="2"| Career
| 315 || 168 || 15.9 || .490 || .000 || .657 || 3.9 || .3 || .2 || .7 || 4.8

Playoffs

|-
| style="text-align:left;"| 2001
| style="text-align:left;"| Phoenix
| 4 || 4 || 18.8 || .375 || .000 || .000 || 7.0 || .0 || .0 || 1.8 || 3.0
|-
| style="text-align:left;"| 2004
| style="text-align:left;"| Memphis
| 1 || 0 || 3.0 || .000 || .000 || 1.000 || .0 || .0 || .0 || .0 || 2.0
|-
| style="text-align:left;"| 2006
| style="text-align:left;"| Memphis
| 4 || 3 || 14.9 || .600 || .000 || .500 || 2.8 || .5 || .3 || .3 || 3.3
|-
| style="text-align:left;"| 2007
| style="text-align:left;"| Houston
| 1 || 0 || 2.8 || .000 || .000 || 1.000 || 4.0 || .0 || .0 || .0 || 2.0
|- class="sortbottom"
| style="text-align:center;" colspan="2"| Career
| 10 || 7 || 14.0 || .462 || .000 || .833 || 4.3 || .2 || .1 || .8 || 2.9

EuroLeague

|-
| style="text-align:left;"| 2007–08
| style="text-align:left;"| Olympiacos
| 13 || 4 || 11.1 || .808 || .000 || .588 || 2.5 || 0.2 || 0.2 || 0.2 || 4.0 || 5.7

References

External links
NBA.com Profile
Euroleague.net Profile
Euroleague Statistics
Hellenic Federation Profile 

1979 births
Living people
AEK B.C. players
Centers (basketball)
Expatriate basketball people from Georgia (country) in the United States
Georgian people of Greek descent
Greek men's basketball players
Greek Basket League players
Greek expatriate basketball people in the United States
Greek people of Georgian descent
Houston Rockets players
Memphis Grizzlies players
Men's basketball players from Georgia (country)
National Basketball Association players from Georgia (country)
National Basketball Association players from Greece
Olympiacos B.C. players
People from Rustavi
Phoenix Suns draft picks
Phoenix Suns players
1998 FIBA World Championship players